Kababir is a mixed neighbourhood with a majority of Ahmadi Muslim Arabs and a significant minority of Jews in Haifa, Israel.

History
The Ahmadiyya Muslim Community was founded in the 19th century, originating in India and settled in Kababir. Most of the families who were displaced to Kababir are originally from the village of Ni'lin near Jerusalem. One of the biggest and most well known family is the Odeh's family. They built the neighbourhood's first mosque on Mount Carmel in 1931, and a larger grand mosque in the 1980s. Also the Shambor family is one of the biggest in neighborhood. The Mosque is named after the second Ahmadi Khalifa Mirza Basheer-ud-Din Mahmood Ahmad. The grand mosque has two white minarets standing 34 metres tall, which dominate the low-rise skyline of the residential neighbourhoods on the ridges nearby. In the beginning, the neighbourhood was managed as a commune in which every working male contributed a fee to a mutual account. Some of the men joined the Turkish army, while some worked in the oil refinery in the city of Haifa. Others worked building the Port of Haifa.

See also
Ahmadiyya in Israel
Mahmood Mosque (Kababir)

References

Neighborhoods of Haifa
Ahmadiyya places